Iiro Luoto (born October 8, 1984) is a Finnish gridiron football tight end who is an international practice squad player for the New York Jets of the National Football League. He originally played for the Helsinki Roosters at the Vaahteraliiga (Maple league). He then played two seasons in NFL Europa before being assigned to the Jets in 2007. Luoto was transferred from Calanda Broncos to Helsinki Wolverines in February 2013.

External links

 Iiro Luoto at TheFootballDatabase
 New York Jets bio

1984 births
Living people
Finnish players of American football
American football tight ends
Frankfurt Galaxy players
Rhein Fire players
New York Jets players
Finnish expatriate sportspeople in Germany
Finnish expatriate sportspeople in the United States
Finnish expatriate sportspeople in Switzerland
Sportspeople from Helsinki